Ptolemy; died 333 BC) son of Seleucus from Orestis or Tymphaia, was one of the select officers called Somatophylaces, or guards of the king's person; he combined with that distinguished post the command of one of the divisions of the phalanx. Ptolemy was from an upper noble family. He was lately married when he accompanied Alexander on his expedition to Asia, 334 BC, on which account he was selected by the king to command the body of Macedonians, who were allowed to return home for the winter at the end of the first campaign. In the following spring he rejoined Alexander at Gordium, with the troops under his command, accompanied by fresh reinforcements. At the Battle of Issus (333 BC) his division of the phalanx was one of those opposed to the Greek mercenaries under Darius III, and upon which the real brunt of the action consequently devolved; and he himself fell in the conflict, after displaying the utmost valour.

References
Smith, William (editor); Dictionary of Greek and Roman Biography and Mythology, "Ptolemaeus (4)", Boston, (1867)

Notes

Somatophylakes
Generals of Alexander the Great
Ancient Orestians
Ancient Macedonian generals
333 BC deaths
Year of birth unknown